Cheryl A. Head is an African-American author known for her crime fiction, particularly Charlie Mack Motown Mysteries series. In 2019, Head was inducted into the Saints & Sinners LGBTQ+ Literary Festival Hall of Fame and also serves as a national board member for Bouchercon.

Early life 
She was born and lived in Detroit before relocating to Washington in 1991 to work in public broadcasting.

Career 
Head's debut novel, Long Way Home: A World War II Novel, explores the themes of race, and sexual identity, and was a finalist in the African American Literature and Historical Fiction categories of the 2015 Next Generation Indie Book Awards.

Her Charlie Mack Motown Mystery Novel series has also received critical acclaim. Bury Me When I'm Dead, the first book in the series, was a finalist in the 29th Lambda Literary Awards, and Wake Me When It's Over was included on the 2017 African-American Book List of the Detroit Public Library. Catch Me When I'm Falling was a finalist in the mystery category of the Next Generation Indie Book Awards.

The most recent book in the Charlie Mack series, Warn Me When It's Time, won a Silver Medal from the Independent Publisher Book Awards., and was an Anthony Award nominee. It narrates the story of a lesbian private investigator in Detroit, investigates the bombing of a mosque.

For her Charlie Mack series, Head has been nominated twice for Lammy Awards. She has also won The Alice B Readers Award in 2022.

Her new novel, "Time's Undoing," narrates the story of a young reporter investigating her great-grandfather's death in 1929 with his own narration of his life leading up to his death. The book is based on the life and death of Head's own grandfather, who moved from St. Petersburg to Birmingham in 1929 and was shot to death by a police officer.

Bibliography

See also 
 33rd Lambda Literary Awards
 List of lesbian fiction
 The Alice B Readers Award

References 

People from Detroit
Living people
African-American women writers
Literature by African-American women
American crime fiction writers
Anthony Award winners